Kutak-e Rayisi (also romanized as Kūtak-e Rayīsī; also known as Kūh Tak and Kūtak) is a village in Karian Rural District, in the Central District of Minab County, Hormozgan Province, Iran. At the 2006 census, its population was 100, in 16 families.

References 

Populated places in Minab County